Simon Bright is an art director and set decorator who is best known for The Lord of the Rings films.

Oscar nominations
Both of these are in Best Art Direction.

2005 Academy Awards-Nominated for King Kong. Nomination shared with Dan Hennah and Grant Major. Lost to Memoirs of a Geisha.
2012 Academy Awards-Nominated for The Hobbit: An Unexpected Journey. Nomination shared with Dan Hennah and Ra Vincent. Lost to Lincoln.

Selected filmography
The Hobbit: The Battle of the Five Armies (2014)
The Hobbit: The Desolation of Smaug (2013)
The Hobbit: An Unexpected Journey (2012)
Avatar (2009)
King Kong (2005)
The Lord of the Rings: The Return of the King (2003)
The Lord of the Rings: The Two Towers (2002)
The Lord of the Rings: The Fellowship of the Ring (2001)

References

External links

Living people
Year of birth missing (living people)
Art directors
Set decorators